Nothing Lasts Forever is an album by the American anarcho street punk band Defiance. It was released on Mind Control Records in 1998.

Critical reception
AllMusic wrote that "the last album by the original lineup of Defiance before an extended hiatus, Nothing Lasts Forever has a dispirited, defeatist tone—even more so than usual for this brand of metal-tinged post-hardcore punk—in both the album title and songs like the sneering 'Kill the Bastards' and the churning thrash of 'It's Never Gonna Change'."

Track listing 
Nowhere - 3:16
Don't Want It - 2:48
Dead and Gone - 3:41
Cheers - 2:46
Nothing Worth Dying For - 2:59
It's Never Gonna Change - 2:58
Kill the Bastards - 2:48
You Don't Know - 2:36
Emergency - 2:38 (Motörhead cover)
Nothing Lasts Forever - 2:08

References

1998 albums
Defiance (punk band) albums